See related articles romvong, ramkbach, kantrum, pinpeat orchestra, and music of Cambodia.
Jamrieng Samai (ចម្រៀងសម័យ) is a genre of pop music from Cambodia.  The slower dance music, ramvong and ramkbach are the two separate types of Jamrieng samai.

Footnotes

References
Music of Cambodia wmix.org

See also
Khmer classical dance
Dance of Cambodia
Culture of Cambodia

Cambodian culture
Cambodian music
Popular music